Epping Forest, Maryland is a private community located near Annapolis, Maryland. Epping Forest is close to Baltimore and Washington, DC.

History 

Formation

Dr. Arthur Drevar, a graduate of London School of Surgery and a world traveler, bought a parcel of land on the west shore of the Severn River in 1874. Dr. Drevar built a frame house on the hill overlooking the old beach area until such a time as he could build a manor house. However, Mrs. Drevor became ill and lost her eyesight; the English Manor was never built. The area was beautifully kept. The huge boxwood trees and planted shrubbery and flowers, with terraces down to the sandy beach, made a beautiful spot. A barn was built and a pump was used to water the animals as the water was not fit for human consumption. The Doctor kept ducks and peacocks. Bees were kept on the site of the Tea House. Sheep roamed over Sheeps Hill now called Broadlee Trail.

In 1926 Severn Shores, Inc. bought the entire tract of land from the end of the county-owned Epping Forest road down the two inlets, Clements Bay and Salt Pan Bay. In view of the proximity of Epping Forest to Sherwood Forest in England, and the fact that the two summer places would be near one another, it was decided to call this one Epping Forest. The land was surveyed, the lots, roads, parks, lanes and paths indicated and the plat filed with the county court. The spring of 1926, Epping Forest was opened to the public for the sale of lots and was appropriately advertised in newspapers.

In the early days, access to Epping Forest was not easy. Defense Highway did not open to the public until December 1927. Also, while General's Highway from Carr's Corner (now the Annapolis Mall) to the entrance of Epping Forest was under construction, it was necessary to drive to the top of "Bean Hill" to avoid being bogged down. In spite of reasonable precautions, it was often necessary to be towed out by truck, a team of horses or even a yoke of oxen.

Early developments

The early cottagers and owners endured many inconveniences – candles and kerosene lamps for lighting; primitive methods of cooking, even to the iron pot in the fireplace, water either carried from home or from one of the few drilled wells: chemical toilets or the small buildings outside. In order to provide refreshments for the prospective buyers, "Ye English Inn" was built. A dinner for $1.00 was advertised in the newspapers and proved to be a very satisfactory and well cooked meal of fried fish, fried chicken, choice of three vegetables, salad, bread and butter, ice cream, cake and coffee, and was a real drawing card. The bathing beach with bath-house was on the shore of Epping Park and was used exclusively until 1928. Free fish fries and free oyster roasts were given by the company to entice people to visit the Forest. These events were held on the picnic grounds. It was here that all community meetings were held.

April 1927 was the first anniversary and a large fish fry and flower festival was held. People for miles around came to see the display. By 1927 the question of making Epping Forest a closed community was raised. A meeting was held on the picnic grounds at which it was decided to establish the Epping Forest Club, with dues and restrictions in further deeds to show that buyers agreed to become members of the club with obligation for dues for such membership. On December 12, 1927, in compliance with the action taken October 23 at the big oyster roast on the picnic ground at Epping Forest, a meeting of property owners was held in the Washington office of Severn Shores, Inc., and an association was formed to be known as Epping Forest Club. At this meeting, officers and the Board of Governors were elected, and a copy of the proposed By-Laws was presented and approved. The Board of Governors held a meeting January 3, 1928, and ordered the constitution and By-Laws printed and a copy sent to each property owner. Severn Shores, Inc. deeded to Epping Forest Club all parks, paths, lanes and a parcel of land on which to build a clubhouse as well as a number of lots to be sold to finance road construction. By 1928, there were 55 houses with more under construction. Prompt action was taken to expedite the building of the club house and pier. They were completed and officially dedicated on the final day of a three-day Labor Day celebration, September 3, 1928. The furnishings consisted of settees, easy chairs, tables, wall hangings and other necessary articles, resulting in an attractive setting. Kerosene lamps furnished illumination.

1930s

By 1930 there were 98 cottages. A franchise was given by the Epping Forest Club to the Annapolis and Chesapeake Bay Company, April 22, 1930, for supplying electricity to the Forest. Poles were erected in May of that year. Rural Free Delivery service was started in May 1931, as a summer route. This meant deliveries were made from May 16 to September 15 each year and delivery was available from the watchman's gate to the clubhouse and the area in between. Regular daily delivery throughout the whole year was inaugurated in 1939, and about six years later an extension was made to include several other roads within the Forest.

The year 1934 found Epping Forest in a state of complete confusion and deterioration. Roads had become practically impassable; the clubhouse was in deplorable condition, and the pier had washed away after the Northeast storm of August 1933. There was no curb on visitors. The circle was overgrown. Parks, playgrounds and beaches were ragged and the membership did not seem to care what happened to one of the finest summer colonies on the Severn. A small group was spurred to action. They campaigned with a fine program of rehabilitation. They went to the annual meeting in 1934, and a new slate swept into office. The new board of Governors functioned as a team and won the approval and cooperation of the membership. Out of this organization came great results. A newspaper was regularly printed each month; a new pier was built; $1,000 was spent to repair the roads the first year, and $1,500 the second year; all out of dues. The clubhouse was remodeled and renovated; beaches, parks and playgrounds were cleaned up; the circle neatly trimmed and attractively planted; back dues were collected, and current members gladly paid promptly.

Recent developments

The Boat Club built a fine new boathouse for equipment and gear. New capital improvements made in the late 1970s and early 1980s were two tennis courts near the clubhouse, a 10,000-gallon water storage tank for fire protection buried under the circle, and a paved bus turn-around at the gate. The clubhouse, beach area, boat facilities, waterworks, roads and chapel were improved. The Garden Club did extensive landscaping of community areas, including Drevar Park. 1980s: This decade saw major changes in Epping Forest as well as in the adjoining area along Epping Forest Road. New communities sprang up. From General's Highway to the Gate House Epping Forest Road was widened and straightened and some sidewalks were added. A traffic light was installed at Route 178. The entrance to Epping Forest, its roads and clubhouse were improved, and street signs were installed. Cable television was made available to the residents. The value of property in the Forest skyrocketed and houses were built on every available lot. Over the years the social life of the community has continued to evolve: Christmas Eve pageants at the chapel, Easter egg hunts, Halloween parties, swimming meets, end of school parties, and Young Foresters Organization (YFO) programs for the children, bowling leagues, tennis and volleyball tournaments, boat rendezvous and dock parties, welcome aboard parties, and May Marts, all in addition to the established customs of the oyster roast, bull roast and Labor Day activities.

Notes

Annapolis, Maryland